Rudolf Markušić (4 February 1911 – 23 December 1945) was a Croatian athlete. He competed in the men's javelin throw at the 1936 Summer Olympics, representing Yugoslavia.

References

External links
 

1911 births
1945 deaths
Athletes (track and field) at the 1936 Summer Olympics
Croatian male javelin throwers
Yugoslav male javelin throwers
Olympic athletes of Yugoslavia
Sportspeople from Pula
People from Austrian Littoral
Croatian Austro-Hungarians